Macrochenus guerini is a species of beetle in the family Cerambycidae. It was described by White in 1858. It is known from India, Nepal and Bangladesh.

References

Lamiini
Beetles described in 1858